Vicki A. Saporta has been the president of the National Abortion Federation since 1995. In 2013, she received the Roger Baldwin Medal of Liberty from the ACLU.

Biography
Saporta was born and raised in Rochester, New York, and graduated from Cornell University in 1974. She went on to study at the London School of Economics, and later served as director of organizing for the International Brotherhood of Teamsters beginning in 1983. For over 20 years, Vicki was the president of the National Abortion Federation until she resigned  after being accused of not taking action when an employee was guilty of sexual harassment.

References

Living people
Activists from Rochester, New York
American abortion-rights activists
Cornell University alumni
International Brotherhood of Teamsters people
Year of birth missing (living people)
American women trade unionists
Alumni of the London School of Economics
21st-century American women